Helena Konanz (née Manset) is an American tennis player and Canadian politician.

College career
Manset attended UCLA for her undergraduate. In 1982, Manset as well as her partner Kathy O'Brien were defeated in the finals of the NCAA Women’s Doubles and in 1982 and 1983 she was named as an All-American. She graduated from UCLA in 1984 with a degree in political science.

Professional career
After being narrowly defeated in the NCAA Women's Doubles Finals Manset began to compete professionally. Manset had competed across the world including in the US Open and Wimbledon. She reached her peak in 1987 when she was ranked 228 overall in women's doubles. She retired from professional tennis on August 17, 1987 after 5 years as a pro player.

Political career
After she retired from tennis Manset began working for Nike which eventually lead to her moving to Canada to work in the sport equipment uniforms. After spending some time in the private sector, Manset (now Konanz) ran for the Penticton City Council and won with 3,737 votes. Konanz was re-elected in 2014. 

In 2018, Konanz opted not to seek re-election and instead announced her candidacy for the Conservative Party of Canada for the 2019 Canadian federal election for the district of South Okanagan—West Kootenay. In September of the same year Konanz won the nomination and was formally announced as the riding's candidate by the Conservatives. In the election, held in October 2019, Konanz finished a close second to New Democratic Party incumbent Richard Cannings. In 2021, a rematch resulted in Cannings winning with an increased majority.

Personal life
Manset married Adam Konanz and changed her name to Helena Konanz in 1995. The couple have two children.

ITF Tour finals

Doubles (1–2)

Electoral record

References

External links
 

1961 births
Living people
American female tennis players
UCLA Bruins women's tennis players
Tennis people from California
Canadian sportsperson-politicians
American emigrants to Canada
British Columbia municipal councillors
Sportspeople from Penticton
Conservative Party of Canada candidates for the Canadian House of Commons
Candidates in the 2019 Canadian federal election
Candidates in the 2021 Canadian federal election